All Saints' School, Bhopal is an English medium school located at Idgah Hills Bhopal, India. It was founded in 1980 by Iris Cynthia Philomene Auer. Miss Auer came to India after she retired as principal of a school in England. From seven pupils in July 1980, the strength has grown to over 2,500 pupils. Miss Auer's was appointed Member of the Order of the British Empire (MBE) in the Queen's Birthday Honours List in 1989.
The Principal and Chairperson of All Saints' School is Mrs. Kaiser Zaman (popularly known as "Bia") . She is an alumnus of University of Oxford, B.Ed and was a student of Miss Auer. She founded All Saints' College Of technology  which is an engineering college of Bhopal M.P. It was visited by Former president late Dr. APJ Abdul Kalam in 2013.

Motto
To the Highest.

Houses
The school has four houses: Vindhya, Himachal, Yamuna and Ganga. There is an annual House Competition with contests, including dancing, singing, elocution, and drama.

Extracurricular activities
There are dance classes, Karate lessons, cricket, football, throwball, and other sports teams. Students participate in tournaments, the most notable being the yearly All Saints versus. Scinidia Boys School, Gwalior. The school has ten black belts in Karate. All Saints has a choir. One of the formal events is the annual farewell party thrown by the 11th grade in honour of the outgoing batch of students

Office bearers
The Head Boy and Head Girl occupy the highest office in the school, followed by Coordinator, Head Prefect, Prefects, and Sub-Prefects. There are other posts assigned to students like Sports Coordinator, Cultural Coordinator. The houses have house captains and vice captains.
List of Head Boys and Head Girls so far is:

1989-1990 - Ashish Jaiswal - Pushpa Hingorani (elected)

1990-1991 - Ashish Jaiswal - Pushpa Hingorani (elected)

1991-1992 - Ashish Jaiswal - Pushpa Hingorani nominated SCHOOL CAPTAIN

1991-1992 - Vinay Shrivastave - Sheran Mendiratta (elected)

1992-1993 - Neeraj Agarwal - Puja Rai

1993-1994 - Deepak Choukse - Shveta Malik

1994-1995 - Naved Masood - Ritu Induria

1995-1996 - Abhay Raj Lodhi - Priyanka Pandey

1996-1997 - Bir Singh Bagga - Sonia Kanjani

1997-1998 - Shekhar Arora - Moushmi Nema

1998-1999 - Amit Nathani - Sabina Sultan

1999-2000 - Janab Choudhuri - Pragti Nagar. Himachal House Captain - Shadab Masood.

2000-2001 - Adnan Abbasi - Payal Pisal

2001-2002 - S M Farooq - Anita Kanjani

2002-2003 - Rohit Singh - Mariyam Saulat

2003-2004 - Md. Karam Abbasi - Jigayasa Balwani

2004-2005 - Nandan Narula - Chani Singh.

2005-2006 - Mohammad Sohaib Iqbal - Richa Manchanda

2006-2007 - Mohd Arshil Muheet -Hena Agarwal

2007-2008 -Rajat agarwal - Mehwish Sajid

2008-2009- Syeda Anam anwar - Rohit Anandani

2009-2010 - Jehangeer hussain- Priyanka Rohera

2010-2011 - Zeeshan Siddiqui - Ayushi Paliwal.

2011-2012 - Anchal Sahu - Anam Habeeb

2013-2014 - Ravish Gurbani - Tasneem Safi [M.P BOARD]

2013-2014 - Abhishek Upadhyay - Yoshita Kaushal.[CBSE]
       
2013-2014 - Suboor Ahmed-Zoya Fatima.

2014-2015- Ankit Singh - Syeda Zia Irshad.

2015-2016- Pulkit Ingle - Meghna Dagaur

2016-2017- Udit Ingle - Samya Khan

2017-2018- Hashir Khan -Arshmah Khan

Captain Yamuna House - Hashir Khan

Captain Ganga House-  Arshmah Khan

Alumni association
Saints' Circle is the alumni association for students.

References

Schools in Bhopal
Educational institutions established in 1980
Private schools in Madhya Pradesh
1980 establishments in Madhya Pradesh